Lafargue may refer to:

 Adolphe Lafargue, Louisiana newspaper publisher, state legislator, and judge 
 Alvan Lafargue, Louisiana physician, politician, and civic leader
 André Lafargue (1917–2017), French journalist and theatre critic
 Édouard Lafargue (1803–1884), French playwright
 Malcolm Lafargue, Louisiana lawyer and politician
 Paul Lafargue, French revolutionary Marxist
 Quentin Lafargue (born 1990), French racing cyclist
 Simone Iribarne Lafargue, French tennis player

Occitan-language surnames